Tha Luang is a district (amphoe) in eastern part of Lopburi province, central Thailand.

History
The minor district (king amphoe) was created on 15 November 1978, when the four tambon Tha Luang, Sab Champha, Nong Phak Waen, and Kaeng Phak Kut were split off from Chai Badan district. On 26 May 1989 it was upgraded to full district status.

Geography
The Pa Sak Cholasit reservoir is the main water resource of the district, used for fishery and as well as irrigation.

Neighbouring districts are (from the north clockwise) Chai Badan and Lam Sonthi of Lopburi, Muak Lek of Saraburi province, and Phatthana Nikhom of Lopburi.

Administration
The district is divided into six sub-districts (tambons), which are further subdivided into 43 villages (mubans). Ban Tha Luang has sub-district municipality (thesaban tambon) status and covers parts of tambon Tha Luang. There are six tambon administrative organizations (TAO).

References

External links
amphoe.com

Tha Luang